The history of the Jews in South Africa began during the period of Portuguese exploration in the early modern era, though a permanent presence was not established until the beginning of Dutch colonisation in the region. During the period of British colonial rule in the 19th century, the Jewish South African community expanded greatly, in part thanks to encouragement from Britain. From 1880 to 1914, the Jewish population in South Africa grew from 4,000 to over 40,000. South African Jews have played an important role in promoting diplomatic and military relations between Israel and South Africa. South Africa's Jewish community has reportedly declined from a possible peak of 120,000 to now between 52,000 and 88,000. Many South African Jews have emigrated to countries in the English-speaking world, such as the United States, Canada, the United Kingdom and Australia, as well as some emigrating to Israel.

History

Portuguese exploration
The first Jews involved in the history of South Africa were explorers, cartographers and astronomers who were employed by the Portuguese Crown. These men were employed in attempts by Portugal to discover a sea route to the Indian subcontinent. Jewish cartographers in Portugal, many of whom were member of the Portuguese upper class, assisted explorers Bartolomeu Dias and Vasco da Gama who sailed around the Cape of Good Hope to India in 1488 and 1497, respectively.

Dutch colonial era
In 1652, the Dutch East India Company (VOC) established a colonial settlement at the Cape of Good Hope under the direction of Jan van Riebeeck. Among the settlers in the colony were a number of non-practising Jews who lived in Cape Town. The first records of Jews living in the colony were a baptism record of two Jewish settlers living in the Western Cape on Christmas Day, 1669. Despite this, Jewish immigration to the colony remained small in number due to the VOC requiring all its employees and settlers to be Protestant. In 1803, the Dutch colonial authorities granted religious freedom to all inhabitants and prospective migrants; when the British invaded and occupied the colony in 1805, they issued a confirmation of this policy the next year.

British colonial era
Jews did not arrive in any significant numbers at Cape Town before the 1820s. The first congregation in South Africa, known as the Gardens Shul, was founded in Cape Town in September 1841, and the initial service was held on the eve of Yom Kippur (the Day of Atonement) in the house of 1820 Settler and businessman Benjamin Norden, located at the corner of Weltevreden and Hof streets. Benjamin Norden, Simeon Markus, together with a score of others arriving in the early 1820s and '30s, were commercial pioneers, especially the Mosenthal brothers—Julius, Adolph (see Aliwal North), and James Mosenthal—who started a major wool industry. By their enterprise in going to Asia and returning with thirty Angora goats in 1856 they became the originators of the mohair industry. Aaron and Daniel de Pass were the first to open up Namaqualand, and from 1849 to 1886 they were the largest shipowners in Cape Town, and leaders of the sealing, whaling, and fishing industries. Jews were among the first to take to ostrich-farming and played a role in the early diamond industry. Jews also played some part in early South African politics. Captain Joshua Norden was shot at the head of his Mounted Burghers in the Xhosa War of 1846; Lieutenant Elias de Pass fought in the Xhosa War of 1849. Julius Mosenthal (1818–1880), brother of the poet S. Mosenthal of Vienna, was a member of the Cape Parliament in the 1850s. Simeon Jacobs, C.M.G. (1832–1883), who was a judge in the Supreme Court of the Cape of Good Hope, as the acting attorney-general of Cape Colony he introduced and carried in 1872 the Cape Colony Responsible Government Bill and the Voluntary Bill (abolishing state aid to the Anglican Church), for both of which bills Saul Solomon, the member for Cape Town, had fought for decades. Saul Solomon (b. St. Helena 25 May 1817; d. 16 October 1892), the leader of the Cape Colony Liberal Party, has been called the "Cape Disraeli." He was invited into the first Responsible government, formed by Sir John Molteno, and declined the premiership itself several times. Like Disraeli, too, he early left the ranks of Judaism.
At the same time, the Jews faced substantial antisemitism. Though freedom of worship was granted to all residents in 1870, the revised Grondwet of 1894 still debarred Jews and Catholics from military posts, from the positions of president, state secretary, or magistrate, from membership in the First and Second Volksraad ("parliament"), and from superintendencies of natives and mines. These positions were restricted to persons above 30 years of age with permanent property and a longer history of settlement. As a consequence of the fact that Boer republics were only in existence from 1857 to 1902, unfortunately many residents of the Boer republics had limited access to positions in the upper echelons of government. All instruction was to be given in a Christian and Protestant spirit, and Jewish and Catholic teachers and children were to be excluded from state-subsidised schools. Before the Boer War (1899–1902), Jews were often considered uitlanders ("foreigners") and excluded from the mainstream of South African life.

However, a small number of Jews also settled among and identified with the rural white Afrikaans-speaking population; these persons became known as Boerejode (Boer Jews). A measure of intermarriage also occurred and was generally accepted.

The South African gold rush began after 1886, attracting many Jews. In 1880, the Jewish population of South Africa numbered approximately 4,000; by 1914 it had grown to more than 40,000. So many of them came from Lithuania that some referred to the population as a colony of Lithuania; Johannesburg was also occasionally called "Jewburg".

Second Boer War
Jews fought on both sides during the Second Boer War (1899–1902), and Jewish soldiers, such as British Army officer Karrie Davies, participated in some of the most significant engagements of the conflict, including the siege of Ladysmith. Nearly 2,800 Jews fought in the war on the British side, and The Spectator reported that 125 of them were killed in action during the conflict. On the opposing side, roughly 300 Jews served on the Boer side; collectively they were known as the Boerjode (Boer Jews). Jews who lived in the Transvaal and South African Republics and held citizenship rights were conscripted along with other residents of the republics (known as burghers), though other Jews volunteered. Jews fighting on the Boer side participated in many of the major engagements of the war, and continued to fight in the guerrilla phase of the conflict as bittereinders; 12 Boerjode are known to have been killed in action, while 80 were captured by the British. Captured Boerjode were held in prisoner-of-war camps in South Africa, Ceylon, Saint Helena, Bermuda and India.

Union of South Africa
Although South Africans Jews were granted equal rights after the Second Boer War, they again became subject of persecution in the days leading up to the Second World War. In 1930, the Quota Act, passed by the South African government, was intended to curtail the emigration of Jews into South Africa. The vast majority of Jews immigrating to South Africa during this period came from Lithuania. The census of 1936 recorded a total of 17,684 Yiddish speakers in the Union of South Africa with 11,528 of them living in the Transvaal. The 1937 Aliens Act, motivated by a sharp increase the previous year in the number of German Jewish refugees coming to South Africa, brought such migration to almost a complete halt. Some Jews were able to enter the country, but many were unable to do so. A total of approximately six-and-a-half thousand Jews came to South Africa from Germany between the years 1933 and 1939. During this period, many Afrikaners sympathised with Nazi Germany due to their anti-British sentiment, and organisations such as Louis Weichardt's "Grayshirts" and the pro-Nazi Ossewabrandwag were openly antisemitic. In the South African Parliament, the opposition National Party argued that the Aliens Act was too lenient and advocated a complete ban on Jewish immigration, a halt in the naturalisation of Jewish permanent residents of South Africa and the banning of Jews from certain professions.

After the war, the situation began to improve, and a large number of South African Jews, generally a fairly Zionist community emigrated to the State of Israel. South African Jews in Israel number around 20,000 in the 21st century. During this time, there were also two waves of Jewish immigration to Africa from the island of Rhodes, first in the 1900s and then after 1960.

In this period, Jewish activism in South Africa also included attempts to secure the position of Jews overseas. In 1933, following the rise of the Nazi Party in Germany, a correspondent for the South African Medical Journal reported on the systematic oppression of Jewish medical professionals in Germany. These actions included denial of graduations for Jewish medical students, employment bans, forced resignations, raids on a Jewish medical association, and violent attacks on individual doctors. The report concluded that the actions of the Nazi regime likely had the tacit support of the German medical establishment and ended with the request that South African doctors protest the actions.

Post-Second World War

South African Jews and Israel

When the Afrikaner-dominated National Party came to power in 1948 it did not adopt an anti-Jewish policy despite its earlier position. In 1953 South Africa's Prime Minister, D. F. Malan, became the first foreign head of government to visit Israel though the trip was a "private visit" rather than an official state visit. This began a long history of cooperation between Israel and South Africa on many levels. The proudly Zionistic South African Jewish community, through such bodies as the South African Zionist Federation and a number of publications, maintained a cordial relationship with the South African government even though it objected to the policies of Apartheid being enacted. South Africa's Jews were permitted to collect huge sums of money to be sent on as official aid to Israel, in spite of strict exchange-control regulations. Per capita, South African Jews were reputedly the most financially supportive Zionists abroad.

Settlement of South African Jews in Israel 

A number of South African Jews settled in Israel, forming a South African community in Israel. Perhaps the most famous South African community founded in Israel is Savyon, which remains the wealthiest suburb in Israel. Large houses were built in the style that the community was accustomed to from their life in South Africa, each with a pool, and developed around a country club.

South Africa and Israel 

Most African states broke ties with Israel after the 1973 Yom Kippur War, and Israel began to view the similarly isolated South Africa cordially. Ethan A. Nadelmann claimed that the relationship developed due to the fact that many African countries broke diplomatic ties with Israel during the 1970s following the Six-Day War and Yom Kippur War, causing Israel to deepen relations with other isolated countries.

By the mid-1970s, Israel's relations with South Africa were warm. In 1975, the Israel–South Africa Agreement was signed, and increasing economic cooperation between Israel and South Africa was reported, including the construction of a major new railway in Israel, and the building of a desalination plant in South Africa. In April 1976 South African Prime Minister John Vorster was invited to make a state visit, meeting Israeli Prime Minister Yitzhak Rabin. Later in 1976, the 5th Conference of Non-Aligned Nations in Colombo, Sri Lanka, adopted a resolution calling for an oil embargo against France and Israel because of their arms sales to South Africa. In 1977, South African Foreign Minister Pik Botha visited Israel to discuss South African issues with Israeli Prime Minister Menachem Begin and Foreign Minister Moshe Dayan.

Benjamin Beit-Hallahmi, an Israeli professor of psychology, wrote in 1988 that the alliance between South Africa and Israel was one of the most underreported news stories of the past four decades and that Israel played a crucial role in the survival of the South African regime. Israel's collaboration with Apartheid South Africa was mentioned and condemned by various international organisations like the UN General Assembly (several times since 1974). In 1987 Israel announced that it would be implementing sanctions against South Africa. By the beginning of the 1990s, military and economic ties between the two countries had been lost.

Moderation and liberalism
South African Jews have a history of political moderation and the majority supported opposition parties such as first the United Party, then the Liberal Party, Progressive Party and its successors during the decades of National Party apartheid rule. (See Liberalism in South Africa). The prime example of the more moderate approach is that of the highly assimilated Harry Oppenheimer (1908–2000) (born Jewish but converted to Anglicanism upon his marriage), the richest man in South Africa and the chairman of the De Beers and Anglo American corporations. He was a supporter of the liberal Progressive Party and its policies, believing that granting more freedom and economic growth to South Africa's Black African majority was good politics and sound economic policy. The banner for this cause was held high by Helen Suzman, as the lone Progressive Party member in South Africa's parliament, representing the voting district of Houghton, home to many wealthy Jewish families at the time. The Progressive Party (later renamed the Democratic Party and then the Democratic Alliance) was later led by Jewish politician, Tony Leon and his successor, Helen Zille. Zille is of Jewish descent: her parents separately left Germany in the 1930s to avoid Nazi persecution (her maternal grandfather and paternal grandmother were Jewish).

In 1980, after 77 years of neutrality, South Africa's National Congress of the Jewish Board of Deputies passed a resolution urging "all concerned [people] and, in particular, members of our community to cooperate in securing the immediate amelioration and ultimate removal of all unjust discriminatory laws and practices based on race, creed, or colour". This inspired some Jews to intensify their anti-apartheid activism, but the bulk of the community either emigrated or avoided public conflict with the National Party government.

The Jewish establishment and the majority of South African Jews remained focused on Jewish issues. A few rabbis spoke out against apartheid early, but they failed to gain support and it was not until 1985 that the rabbinate as a whole condemned apartheid (Adler 2000). The South African Union for Progressive Judaism (SAUPJ) took the strongest stand of any of the Jewish movements in the country against apartheid. It opposed disinvestment while women in the movement engaged in social work as a form of protest. This includes the Moses Weiler School in Alexandra where for generations the school has been funded and led by women from the Progressive movement, even in opposition to the Bantu Education Act, 1953 (Feld 2014).

Today
Although the Jewish community peaked in the 1970s (at around 120,000), about 52,000 mostly nominally Orthodox, remain in South Africa. A proportion are secular, or have converted to Christianity. Despite low intermarriage rates (around 7%), approximately 1,800 Jews emigrate every year, mainly to Israel, Australia, Canada and the United States. The Jewish community in South Africa is currently the largest in Africa, and, although shrinking due to emigration, it remains one of the most nominally Orthodox communities in the world, although there is a smaller Progressive community, especially in Cape Town. The nation's Progressive communities are represented by the South African Union for Progressive Judaism (SAUPJ). The current Orthodox chief rabbi, Warren Goldstein (2008), has been widely credited for initiating a "Bill of Responsibilities" which the government has incorporated in the national school curriculum. The chief rabbi has also pushed for community run projects to combat crime in the country.

The community has become more observant and in Johannesburg, the largest centre of Jewish life with 40,000 Jews, there is a high number and density of kosher restaurants and religious centres. In politics, the Jewish community continues to have influence, particularly in leadership roles. Currently, the sole national Jewish newspaper, with a readership of about 40,000, is the South African Jewish Report. In 2008, a Jewish radio station, ChaiFM, commenced broadcasting in Johannesburg, and also broadcasting on the internet to the large South African "diaspora". Despite a fall in number, since 2003 the number of South African Jews has stabilised.

The 2016 Community Survey mini-census conducted by Statistics South Africa found the largest numbers in the following municipalities:
Johannesburg 23,420; Cape Town 12,672; Ethekwini (Durban) 3,599; Ekurhuleni (East Rand) 1,846; Tshwane (Pretoria) 1,579; Nelson Mandela Bay (Port Elizabeth) 623; Msunduzi (Pietermaritzburg) 600; Mangaung (Bloemfontein) 343; Stellenbosch 316; Buffalo City (East London) 251; Mbombela (Nelspruit) 242.

Lemba people

The Lemba or Remba are a southern African ethnic group whose members are to be found in Zimbabwe and South Africa with some little known branches in Mozambique and Malawi. According to Tudor Parfitt they are thought to number 70,000. They speak the Bantu languages spoken by their geographic neighbours and resemble them physically, but they have some religious practices and beliefs similar to those in Judaism and Islam, which they claim were transmitted by oral tradition. They have a tradition of ancient Jewish or South Arabian descent through their male line. Genetic Y-DNA analyses in the 2000s have established a partially Middle-Eastern origin for a portion of the male Lemba population. More recent research argues that DNA studies do not support claims for a specifically Jewish genetic heritage.

Jewish education in South Africa

Traditionally, Jewish education in South Africa was conducted by the Cheder or Talmud Torah, while children received secular education at government and private schools. There were, initially, no formal structures in place for Rabbinical education. (Note that although the majority of South Africa's Jews are descendants of Lithuanian Jews who venerated Talmudic scholarship, the community did not establish schools or yeshivot for several decades.)

An important change took place in 1947, when King David School was established as the first full-time dual-curriculum (secular and Jewish) Jewish day school – the high school was established in 1955. Today, the King David schools are, combined, amongst the largest Jewish day schools in the world. Umhlanga Jewish Day School (subsequently renamed), was opened in January 2012, to cater for Jewish children in the greater Durban area. In total, nineteen Day Schools, affiliated to the South African Board of Jewish Education, have been established in the main centres. The Jewish day schools regularly place amongst the top in the country in the national Matric examinations

The first religious day school, the Yeshiva College of South Africa, was established in the mid-1950s, drawing primarily on the popularity of the Bnei Akiva Religious Zionist youth movement. As an institution with hundreds of pupils, Yeshivah College is today the largest religious school in the country, with Torah studied alongside the national curriculum.

Other educational institutions sharing this same Religious Zionist / Modern Orthodox ideology include the kollel (Bet Mordechai) and midrasha of Mizrachi, Johannesburg, and the Yeshiva of Cape Town, a Torah MiTzion kollel.

Rabbi Avraham Tanzer, Rosh Yeshiva at Yeshiva College for over 50 years, is credited with the growth of that school and its associated institutions, but more broadly, with the "massive sea change for the South African Jewish community and for its spiritual development".

In parallel to the establishment of Yeshiva College, and drawing on the same momentum, several smaller yeshivot were opened, starting in the 1960s. The Yeshivah Gedolah of Johannesburg, established in 1973 by Rabbi Azriel Goldfein, is the best known of these, having trained dozens of South African Rabbis, including Chief Rabbi Dr Warren Goldstein. The Yeshiva follows the "Telshe" educational model, although accommodates students from across the spectrum of Hashkafa. See also Orthodox yeshivas in South Africa.

This era also saw the start of a large network of Chabad-Lubavitch activities and institutions. There is today a Lubavitch Yeshiva in Johannesburg (Lubavitch Yeshiva Gedolah of Johannesburg) serving the Chabad community, a Chabad Semicha programme in Pretoria (having ordained 98 Rabbis since its establishment in 2001), and Lubavitch Day schools in Johannesburg (the Torah Academy school) and Cape Town. Johannesburg boasts ten Chabad Houses, Cape Town two and Kwazulu-Natal one, all of which offer a variety of Torah classes and adult education and informal children's education programmes.

The 1970s saw the establishment of a Haredi kollel, Yad Shaul, as well as the growth of a large baal teshuva movement, with other yeshivas established also. This was supported by the Israel-based organisations Ohr Somayach and Aish HaTorah, which established active branches in South Africa in the 1980s and 1990s (Arachim had an active presence then also). Notable figures such as Moshe Sternbuch and Aharon Pfeuffer played a major role in the Haredi community at that time, with Akiva Tatz being an especially popular speaker. Yad Shaul was led by Boruch Grossnass for over 40 years.

There are today several Haredi boys' schools in Johannesburg, each associated with one of the yeshivot, as well as a Beis Yaakov girls' school. Ohr Somayach, South Africa operates a full-time Yeshiva in Johannesburg ("Yeshivas Meshech Chochma") – with its bet midrash established in 1990, and its kollel (Toras Chaim) in 1996 – as well as a midrasha; it also runs a bet midrash in Cape Town. Aish HaTorah emphasizes student-focused programming – lectures and retreats, as well as various group trips to Israel – and also runs a community synagogue for singles and young marrieds.

The Progressive Movement maintains a network of supplementary Hebrew and Religious classes at its temples. These schools are all affiliated to the SA Union for Progressive Judaism. Rabbi Sa'ar Shaked, congregational rabbi of Beit Emanuel Progressive Synagogue is currently involved in efforts to establish a Rabbinic Academy and Higher Education Institution in Gauteng.

Conservative / Masorti's presence in South Africa is limited to one synagogue in Johannesburg.

Limmud was introduced to the country in 2007. The Limmud South Africa conferences are held in August/September each year. South Africa's Orthodox rabbis do not participate, unlike the UK's Orthodox Rabbinate part of whom have taken part in Limmud UK; see .

See also

Antisemitism in South Africa
Afrikaner-Jews
Chief Rabbi of South Africa
Jewish Report
South African Jewish Maritime League

Notes

References
Adler, Franklin Hugh (2000)

External links

General
South African Jewish Board of Deputies, the central representative institution of the South African Jewish community
Jewish South Africa
Jewish Virtual History Tour of South Africa – Jewish Virtual Library
Jews in South Africa – Jay Sand
Lithuanian Jews make big impact in South Africa – Reuters
South Africa – Jewish Encyclopedia
"Jews on Commando", Saks, D.Y. (2005), Southern Africa Jewish Genealogy
Zimbabwe Jewish Community history web site A comprehensive overview of the history of the community, from early settlement in Northern and Southern Rhodesia to life today.
How the guard has changed since Rhodes stormed the SA economy, "Without the Jewish people, the country would have taken many more years to evolve", The Sunday Times
The Jewish Community of Johannesburg, 1886-1939. Rubin, Margot W. University of Pretoria, 2006
The Jewish community in the post-apartheid era: same narrative, different meaning, Herman, Chaya. University of Pretoria, 2007
Southern African Jewish Rootsbank Database

Jewish education
South African Union of Jewish Students
Jewish Agency for Israel
Schools
Full listing: jewishweb.co.za
King David Schools
Herzlia Schools
Yeshiva College of South Africa
Torah Academy School
Theodor Herzl School
Phyllis Jowell Jewish Day School
Cape Town Torah High

Religious institutions
List of Synagogues
Chabad-Lubavitch Centers in South Africa; Chabad, Johannesburg
Ohr Somayach South Africa
Machon L'Hora'ah The Pretoria Yeshiva
South African Union for Progressive Judaism